Dangerous Game or The Dangerous Game may refer to:

Film 
 The Dangerous Game (1933 film), a Swedish film
 Dangerous Game (1937 film), a German comedy film
 The Dangerous Game (1942 film), a Norwegian comedy film
 Dangerous Games, a 1958 French film
 Dangerous Games (film), a 1974 Estonian film directed by Veljo Käsper
 Dangerous Game (1987 film), an Australian film directed by Stephen Hopkins
 Dangerous Game (1993 film), an American film directed by Abel Ferrara
 Dangerous Game (2017 film), a British action film

Literature 
 A Dangerous Game (novel), a 1956 novel by Friedrich Dürrenmatt
 The Dangerous Games, a 2002 novel by Jude Watson in the Star Wars Jedi Quest book series
 Dangerous Games (anthology), a 2007 science fiction anthology edited by Jack Dann and Gardner Dozois
 Dangerous Games (Nancy Drew/Hardy Boys), a 1991 Hardy Boys and Nancy Drew Supermystery novel
Dangerous Games (Steel novel), a 2017 novel by Danielle Steel
 Dangerous Games, a 1996 novel by Clayton Emery

Music 
 Dangerous Games (album), 1986 album by American heavy metal band Alcatrazz
 "Dangerous Game" (Network 3 song), 1981 single by British Christian trio Network 3
 "Dangerous Game", 3 Doors Down song from the album Away from the Sun
 "Dangerous Game", Kylie Minogue song from the album Kylie Minogue

Other 
 Dangerous Game (TV series), American hunting show debuted in 1994
 Dangerous Games (TV series), American-Armenian drama
 Big five game, referred to as Dangerous Game by hunters

See also
 A Dangerous Game (disambiguation)
 The Most Dangerous Game (disambiguation)